Alastair Brindle (26 April 1939 – 15 September 2021) was an English professional rugby league footballer who played in the 1950s and 1960s for his hometown team, Warrington.

Playing career

Brindle made his debut for Warrington as an 18-year-old  vs St Helens at Knowsley Road in September 1957.  Brindle established himself in the team in the 1958/59 season and remained a regular for the next 12 seasons playing alongside club legend Brian Bevan.

The following season, Brindle was in the side that finished second in the league and reached the 1961 Championship Final at Odsal, only to lose out to Leeds.

In 1962/3 he played in the Warrington side that just missed out on reaching Wembley, losing to Wakefield in the semi-final. Brindle was part of the Warrington side that beat Rochdale to win the Lancashire Cup in 1965 which would be Brindle's second and final trophy with Warrington.

In 1965, Brindle played against the touring New Zealand side at Wilderspool which Warrington lost 7-14.

Brindle's Testimonial game was played in 1968 at Wilderspool, which was an All Star Soccer game between Warrington and an All Star XI which consisted of Brian Bevan, Brian Glover, Jackie Edwards, Laurie Gilfedder and Alex Murphy.

Brindle played his very last game for Warrington on 12 April 1969 against Wigan at Wilderspool.
 
Brindle was inducted into the Warrington Hall of Fame in 2015.

Honours
 1959–60 Lancashire Cup
 1965–66 Lancashire Cup

References

1939 births
2021 deaths
English rugby league players
Rugby league players from Warrington
Rugby league props
Warrington Wolves players